The 3rd Annual Tranny Awards was a pornographic awards event recognizing the best in transgender pornography form the previous year from November 1, 2009, to 31 October 2010. The nominees for the 3rd Tranny Awards were announced on January 9, 2011, online on the trannyawards.com website. The winners were announced during the awards on February 5, 2011.

The winners were decided by a mixture a panel of industry judges and fan voting.

This was the third awards dedicated to recognising achievements in transgender pornography. Steven Grooby the founder of the awards stated that he wanted to address the lack of representation of transgender performers in awards. Grooby stated "The event went better than I'd hoped, and the plan is to use this as springboard for something bigger next year."

Winners and nominees
The nominees for the 3rd Tranny Awards were announced on January 9, 2011, online on the trannyawards.com website. The winners were announced during the awards on February 5, 2011.

Awards

Winners are listed first, highlighted in boldface.

References

Transgender Erotica Awards
Pornographic film awards
21st-century awards
American pornographic film awards
Annual events in the United States
Awards established in 2008
Culture of Los Angeles
Adult industry awards